A peripheral vascular examination is a medical examination to discover signs of pathology in the peripheral vascular system. It is performed as part of a physical examination, or when a patient presents with leg pain suggestive of a cardiovascular pathology.

The exam includes several parts:
Position/lighting/draping
Inspection
Palpation
Auscultation
Special maneuvers

Position/lighting/draping
Position – patient should be lying in the supine position and the bed or examination table should be flat. The patient's hands should remain at their sides with their head resting on a pillow.

Lighting – adjusted so that it is ideal.

Draping – the legs should be exposed, the groin and thigh covered. Drapes are usually placed between the legs.

Inspection
On inspection the clinician looks for signs of:

 trauma
 previous surgery (scars)
 muscle wasting/muscle asymmetry
 edema (swelling)
 erythema (redness)
 ulcers – arterial ulcers tend to be on the borders / sides of the foot, neuropathic ulcers on the plantar surface of the foot, venous ulcers tend on be on the medial aspect of the leg superior to the medial malleolus.
 hair – hair is absent in peripheral vascular disease (PVD)
 shiny skin – seen in PVD
 Haemosiderin deposits
 Lipodermatosclerosis

Palpation

 Temperature – cool suggest poor circulation, sides should be compared
 Pitting edema – should be tested for in dependent locations – dorsum of foot, if present then on the shins. If the patient has been in bed for a longer period of time one should check the sacrum.
 Capillary refill – should be less than 3 seconds.

Arterial pulses
 Dorsalis pedis artery pulse – on dorsal surface of the foot, running lateral to the tendon of the first toe
 Posterior tibial artery pulse – posterior and inferior to the medial malleolus
 Popliteal artery pulse – behind the knee, typically done with both hands
 Femoral artery pulse – in the femoral triangle / halfway between the ASIS and pubic tubercle

Auscultation
 For femoral artery bruits

Special maneuvers
 Ankle-brachial pressure index (ABPI) assesses peripheral vascular disease. It may however be unreliable in patients with calcified arteries in the calf (often diabetic patients) or those with extensive oedema, in which case toe pressure or Toe-brachial pressure index (TBPI) should be measured to aid in the diagnosis.
 Venous refill with dependency (should be less than 30 seconds) – the vein should bulge outward within 30 seconds of elevation for one minute.
 Buerger's test (assessment of arterial sufficiency):With the patient supine, note the colour of the feet soles. They should be pink. Then elevate both legs to 45 degrees for more than 1 minute. Observe the soles. If there is marked pallor (whiteness), ischemia should be suspected. Next check for rubor of dependency. Sit the patient upright and observe the feet. In normal patients, the feet quickly turn pink. If, more slowly, they turn red like a cooked lobster, suspect ischemia.
 Brodie-Trendelenburg test (assessment of valvular competence if varicose veins are present):One leg at a time. With the patient supine, empty the superficial veins by 'milking' the leg in the distal to proximal direction. Now press with your thumb over the saphenofemoral junction (2.5 cm below and 2.5 cm lateral to the pubic tubercle) and ask the patient to stand while you maintain pressure. If the leg veins now refill rapidly, the incompetence is located below the saphenofemoral junction, and vice versa. This test can be repeated using pressure at any point along the leg until the incompetence has been mapped out.

References

External links
 http://jama.ama-assn.org/cgi/content/full/300/2/197 JAMA: Ankle Brachial Index
 http://circ.ahajournals.org/cgi/content/full/105/7/886 Circulation: Tools for Coronary Risk Assessment

Vascular surgery
Physical examination